Keshari Nath Tripathi (10 November 1934 – 8 January 2023) was an Indian politician who served as Governor of West Bengal from July 2014 to July 2019. He briefly served as governor of Bihar, Meghalaya, and Mizoram at various times. He was a member of Bharatiya Janata Party. He was the Speaker of Uttar Pradesh legislative assembly three times, and the president of Bharatiya Janata Party, Uttar Pradesh.

Personal life
Tripathi was born in Allahabad on 10 November 1934 to Harish Chandra Tripathi and Shiva Devi. 

Tripathi died in Prayagraj, Uttar Pradesh on 8 January 2023, at age 88.

Political career
Tripathi was a member of the Uttar Pradesh legislative assembly six times, from 1977–1980 as part of the Jhusi constituency, and with five consecutive wins from Allahabad South in 1989–1991, 1991–1992, 1993–1995, 1996-2002 and 2002–2007. He was the cabinet minister for institutional finance and sales tax for Uttar Pradesh during the Janata Party regime from 1977 to 1979. He joined the Bharatiya Janata Party when it was founded in April 1980. He served as the speaker of the Uttar Pradesh Legislative Assembly from 1991–1993, 1997–2002 and from May 2002–March 2004.

On 14 July 2014, he was appointed governor of West Bengal and took oath on 24 July. He had additional charges as governor of Bihar from 27 November 2014–15 August 2015, and from 20 June 2017–29 September 2017, as governor of Meghalaya from 6 January 2015–19 May 2015, and as governor of Mizoram from 4 April 2015–25 May 2015 after Aziz Qureshi was dismissed.

Other works 
Tripathi practiced as a senior advocate at Allahabad High Court. He was also an author and poet of several books. His chief literary works are the anthologies Manonukriti and Aayu Pankh. His book Sanchayita: Keshari Nath Tripathi received many accolades,and his commentary on The Representation of People Act, 1951 is still widely esteemed. He wrote many other books in both Hindi and English. He was also a part of a Hindi poets gathering that takes place both in India and abroad.

Literature 
Tripathi authored several books, including The Age of Wings, Sanchayita: Kesharinath Tripathi, Destination Jesus, and The Images. His books have been translated into several other languages as well.

References

External links
 UP Legislative Assembly Website
 Awards

|-

|-

|-

1934 births
2023 deaths
Members of the Uttar Pradesh Legislative Assembly
Bharatiya Janata Party politicians from Uttar Pradesh
Politicians from Allahabad
University of Allahabad alumni
Speakers of the Uttar Pradesh Legislative Assembly
State cabinet ministers of Uttar Pradesh
Governors of West Bengal
Governors of Mizoram
Governors of Meghalaya